Blacklick Township is a township in Cambria County, Pennsylvania, United States. The population was 1,880 at the 2020 census. It is part of the Johnstown, Pennsylvania Metropolitan Statistical Area.

Geography
Blacklick Township is located in western Cambria County at 40.613171,-78.787422. It is bordered to the west by Indiana County. The South Branch of Blacklick Creek forms the majority of the southern border of the township, and the North Branch of Blacklick Creek flows through the western part of the township. The boroughs of Nanty-Glo and Vintondale border the township on the south.

Communities

Unincorporated communities

 Cardiff
 Nipton
 Pindleton
 Twin Rocks

Demographics

At the 2000 census there were 2,200 people, 833 households, and 638 families in the township.  The population density was 70.7 people per square mile (27.3/km2).  There were 897 housing units at an average density of 28.8/sq mi (11.1/km2).  The racial makeup of the township was 99.59% White, 69% African American, 0.05% Asian, 0.05% from other races, and 0.27% from two or more races. Hispanic or Latino of any race were 0.09%.

There were 833 households, 29.4% had children under the age of 18 living with them, 63.1% were married couples living together, 9.2% had a female householder with no husband present, and 23.4% were non-families. 19.7% of households were made up of individuals, and 11.0% were one person aged 65 or older.  The average household size was 2.63 and the average family size was 3.03.

The age distribution was 21.5% under the age of 18, 8.7% from 18 to 24, 28.1% from 25 to 44, 26.1% from 45 to 64, and 15.6% 65 or older.  The median age was 41 years. For every 100 females there were 103.7 males.  For every 100 females age 18 and over, there were 99.8 males.

The median household income was $31,504 and the median family income  was $34,777. Males had a median income of $27,885 versus $21,250 for females. The per capita income for the township was $14,244.  9.8% of the population and 10.0% of families were below the poverty line.   11.9% of those under the age of 18 and 8.1% of those 65 and older were living below the poverty line.

References

Populated places established in 1850
Townships in Cambria County, Pennsylvania